Koyama Press is a comics publishing company founded in 2007 by Annie Koyama and based in Canada.  Since its establishment in 2007, Koyama Press has sought to promote and provide support to an array of emerging and established artists. These artists include Michael DeForge, Jesse Jacobs, Rokudenashiko, and Julia Wertz. Koyama Press  funds and produces a diverse collection of publications and artist's projects. Projects include comics, art books, exhibitions, prints, and zines. Koyama Press has announced its scheduled closure in 2021.

Recognition

Koyama Press won the Joe Shuster Award for Outstanding Comic Book Publisher in 2011.

See also

Canadian comics
Drawn & Quarterly

References

Works cited

External links
Koyama Press

Comic book publishing companies of Canada
Joe Shuster Award winners for Outstanding Publisher